Events from the year 1601 in art.

Events
 (unknown)

Paintings

Caravaggio
The Conversion of Saint Paul (1600-1601)
Conversion on the Way to Damascus
Crucifixion of St. Peter
Supper at Emmaus
Annibale Carracci - Assumption of the Virgin (1600-1601, Cerasi Chapel, Santa Maria del Popolo, Rome)
Peter Paul Rubens - The Deposition

Births
January 19 - Guido Cagnacci, Italian painter of the Bolognese School (died 1663)
March 19 - Alonzo Cano, Spanish painter, architect and sculptor (died 1667)
September 13 - Jan Brueghel the Younger, Flemish painter (died 1678)
November 15 - Cecco Bravo,  Florentine painter of the Baroque period (died 1661)
date unknown
Hendrick Bloemaert, Dutch Golden Age painter (died 1672)
Pieter de Bloot, Dutch painter (died 1658)
Martin Droeshout, engraver (died 1650)
Shi Kefa, Chinese government official and calligrapher (died 1645)
probable
Simon de Vlieger, painter (died 1653)
Paulus Bor, Dutch painter (died 1669)
Michel Corneille the Elder, French painter, etcher, and engraver (died 1664)

Deaths
May 10 - Hans van Steenwinckel the Elder, Flemish/Danish sculptor and architect (born 1550)
July 24 - Joris Hoefnagel, Flemish painter and engraver (born 1542)
date unknown
Giovanni Alberti, Italian painter (born 1558)
Giacomo del Duca, Italian sculptor (born 1520)
Zacharias Dolendo, Dutch engraver (born 1561)
Teodoro Ghisi, Italian engraver (born 1536)
Hugues Sambin, French sculptor and woodworker (born 1520)
Paris Nogari, Italian painter (born 1536)
Cesare Vecellio,  Italian engraver and painter (born 1530)

 
Years of the 17th century in art
1600s in art